Necati Bilican (born 1941, Özbaşı, Posof, Ardahan, Turkey) is a retired Turkish civil servant. He was governor of the OHAL state-of-emergency region from 1995 to 1997, and served three terms as Chief of the General Directorate of Security (April 1990 to July 1991; August 1997 to June 1998; July 1998 to June 1999). Bilican was retired in 1999, after his son's gang connections were exposed and the "tele-ear" wire-tapping scandal had seen him go on sick leave for two months. He had also been governor of Denizli Province (1985–1990) and Edirne Province (1991–1992).

References 

1941 births
People from Ardahan
Living people
Turkish police chiefs
Turkish civil servants
Governors (Turkey)
Istanbul University Faculty of Law alumni